Kaccha Limboo is an Indian movie which was released on 18 February 2011. It stars Taheer Sutarwala, Sarika, Atul Kulkarni, Vinay Pathak and Armaan Malik. The film revolves around a 13-year-old boy named Shambu.

Plot
The words Kaccha Limbo denotes a child who is not mature enough. The movie follows the trials and tribulations of 13 year old Shambu. His friends in school ostracize him for being obese calling him names. Despite his school problems, Shambu does have a loving and caring family. He does not seem to relate to his step father, who seems to have a highly sympathetic attitude. He has crush for a girl, who does seem to despise him for his looks. He continues talking to her as an anonymous another person on phone.

Things take a turn for worse when he accidentally damages another student's video camera, for which he is asked to pay damages. On the same day his forgery of his parents' signatures in the school diary is found out. He runs away from home and finds a new friend in Vitthal, who lived in a slum.

The power of friendship and deep understanding is revealed by one of the slum children he befriends. Shambu is listened to by this special friend, despite his looks, and then things take a turn when Shambu tries to save the life of this friend, who eventually dies.

Cast 
Taheer Sutarwala as Shambu Bandookwala Shrivastava aka Shams
Sarika as Kanchan Bandookwala Shrivastava, Shambu's mother
Atul Kulkarni as Abhay Shrivastava, Shambu's step-father
Vinay Pathak as Raj Gupta, Abhay's friend 
Amrita Raichand as English Teacher
Rajesh Khattar as School Principal 
Armaan Malik as Armaan
Karan Bhanushali as Vitthal
Bhairavi Goswami as Lily Fernandes 
Iravati Harshe
Simran Jehani as Veeneta Kapadia
Rukhsar Rehman as Chandni Gupta, Raj's wife

Soundtrack

Critical response
In a mixed review The Times of India rated the movie 2.5 stars out of five, writing that while "the film began on a right note" as it traced "the world of oddball Shambhu", it changes tracks and that "Shambhu's extended encounters with Vitthal, the bustee kid" end up derailing the plot.

References

External links
 

2011 films
Indian children's films
Indian road movies
2010s Hindi-language films
Films directed by Sagar Ballary
Films scored by Ishq Bector
2010s road movies